The 2007–08 Texas Tech Red Raiders basketball team represented Texas Tech University during the 2007–08 NCAA Division I men's basketball season. The Red Raiders finished 16–15 overall and 7–9 in Big 12 Conference play.

This season marked the final year that Hall of Fame coach Bob Knight led a team. He resigned with 11 games remaining to allow his son and assistant coach, Pat Knight, to lead the team prior to taking over head coaching responsibilities full-time in 2008–09. Bob Knight compiled a 12–8 record before stepping down; Pat then went 4–7 to finish out the year.

References

Texas Tech Red Raiders basketball seasons
Texas Tech
Texas Tech
Texas Tech